Lieutenant Commander Frederick Bedwell (1796–1853) was a sailor in the Royal Navy. He participated in the Peninsular War, the American War of 1812, and was a member of the guard that took Napoleon I of France to banishment on Saint Helena. He was a Master's mate on the  under Phillip Parker King during King's explorations of Australia from 1818 to 1822.

See also
 
 https://www.WikiTree.com/wiki/Bedwell-351

1796 births
1853 deaths
Explorers of Australia
Explorers of Western Australia
Royal Navy officers
Maritime exploration of Australia
19th-century Royal Navy personnel